David "Dave" McClure is an entrepreneur and angel investor based in the San Francisco Bay Area, who founded the business accelerator 500 Startups (now 500 Global), serving as CEO until his resignation in 2017. He founded Practical Venture Capital soon after, a new venture capital fund that will continue to work with companies he previously funded through 500 Startups.

Biography
McClure was born in Morgantown, West Virginia and grew up in Columbia, Maryland. He graduated from Johns Hopkins University in 1988 with a Bachelor of Science in Mathematical Engineering.

Technology startups
McClure founded Aslan Computing, a technology consultancy, in 1994, and  sold the company to Servinet/Panurgy in 1998. He subsequently worked as a technology consultant to Microsoft, Intel and other high-tech companies. He was director of marketing at PayPal from 2001 through 2004. He then launched and ran marketing for Simply Hired in 2005 and 2006.

After leaving PayPal, McClure became a frequent investor in consumer Internet startup companies, investing in and advising more than 15 consumer internet startups, including virtual goods monetization and payments platform Jambool (acquired by Google in 2010) and US online education directory TeachStreet (acquired by Amazon in 2011). During the summer of 2009, McClure was acting investment director for Facebook fbFund (a joint venture incubator/accelerator with prominent venture capital firms Founders Fund and Accel Partners), which provided early-stage capital to startups  using Facebook Platform & Facebook Connect.

In 2010, McClure founded 500 Startups (now 500 Global), a seed accelerator and related investment fund.

McClure gained attention both for his opinionated blog 500 Hats (as of 2011 one of the ten most-read blogs on venture capital finance), and as one of the so-called "Super Angel" investors involved in the Angelgate controversy.

Sexual Harassment Allegations 

In 2017, McClure was identified in a New York Times article, with Sacca, about sexual harassment in venture capital. He was described as sending sexually inappropriate messages to a female investor, who later sought employment at his company. In response, he stepped down from day-to-day management in a post titled "I'm a Creep. I'm Sorry". He then denied the accusations and retracted his apology in another post that was then deleted. A few days later, McClure severed all ties, resigning as general partner as well.

McClure then created a new venture capital fund, Practical Venture Capital, which aims to buy equity in companies he funded through 500 Startups.

References

External links

500hats - investment blog
500 Startups - official site for incubator

Year of birth missing (living people)
Living people
Johns Hopkins University alumni
American businesspeople
People from Morgantown, West Virginia
People from Columbia, Maryland